Lionel John Wood  (born 1944) is a former New Zealand diplomat and a former chancellor of the University of Canterbury. He was Deputy Secretary of Foreign Affairs, and served two separate terms as New Zealand's Ambassador to the United States in Washington.

Early life
Born in Kaikoura, Wood was educated at the University of Canterbury, graduating with an MA (first class honours) in 1964. He then studied at Balliol College, University of Oxford, earning a BPhil.

Professional career
Wood joined the Ministry of Foreign Affairs in 1969, and served as First Secretary in Tokyo in 1974. He then worked as Prime Minister Robert Muldoon’s Foreign Policy adviser, and served as deputy chief of Mission at the New Zealand Embassy in Bonn.

Wood was Deputy Chief of Mission at New Zealand's Embassy in Washington from 1984 to 1987, and Chargé d'Affaires at the post from 1984 to 1985, at a key time in New Zealand's relationship with the United States, including New Zealand's withdrawal from the ANZUS treaty.

Wood was New Zealand's Ambassador to Iran in 1987, and the first ambassador to Turkey in 1989. He was also high commissioner to Pakistan. In 1991 he became Deputy Secretary of Foreign Affairs, responsible for trade and economic policy, and one of the key officials driving New Zealand's role in Asia-Pacific Economic Cooperation (APEC), and the World Trade Organization (WTO). Wood headed New Zealand delegations and negotiations to the WTO Ministerial meetings in Seattle in 1999, and Doha in 2001. He was inducted into the Consumers for World Trade Hall of Fame for his services in the promotion of free trade.

In 1994, Wood became New Zealand's Ambassador to the United States, in Washington. He held this post for four years, before returning to New Zealand again as Deputy Secretary for trade and economic policy. In this post, Wood was instrumental in securing Don McKinnon’s posting as Secretary-General of the Commonwealth, and Mike Moore’s posting as Director-General of the WTO.

In 2002, Wood was again posted as New Zealand's Ambassador to Washington, replacing former Prime Minister Jim Bolger.

Wood retired from the Foreign Service in 2006 to Christchurch, where he became an adjunct professor of Political Science. Wood also received an honorary doctorate from the University of Canterbury in 2004. In the 2006 Queen's Birthday Honours, Wood was appointed a Companion of the Queen's Service Order for public services. In 2009, Treaty of Waitangi Negotiations Minister Chris Finlayson appointed him the Crown's lead negotiator in talks with Whanganui iwi. In August 2017, Wood was appointed chairman of the Canterbury District Health Board by Health Minister Jonathan Coleman, replacing Murray Cleverley (resigned) and succeeding the acting chair Mark Solomon.

As of 2022, Wood is a member of the Board of Te Urewera, a protected area in the North Island.

References

1944 births
People from Kaikōura
Ambassadors of New Zealand to the United States
Ambassadors of New Zealand to Iran
Ambassadors of New Zealand to Turkey
High Commissioners of New Zealand to Pakistan
Living people
New Zealand public servants
University of Canterbury alumni
Alumni of Balliol College, Oxford
Companions of the Queen's Service Order
Chancellors of the University of Canterbury
Canterbury District Health Board members
Academic staff of the University of Canterbury